TECA may refer to: 
 TECA, the original name of the events complex in Aberdeen now known as P&J Live
 Temporary Emergency Court of Appeals, a former US court in operation 1971-93
 Tartan Educational and Cultural Association, a Scottish organisation now part of the Scottish Tartans Authority